Dihydropteroate synthase is an enzyme classified under . It produces dihydropteroate in bacteria, but it is not expressed in most eukaryotes including humans. This makes it a useful target for sulfonamide antibiotics, which compete with the PABA precursor.

  (2-amino-4-hydroxy-7,8-dihydropteridin-6-yl)methyl diphosphate + 4-aminobenzoate (PABA)  diphosphate + dihydropteroate.

All organisms require reduced folate cofactors for the synthesis of a variety of metabolites. Most microorganisms must synthesize folate de novo because they lack the active transport system of higher vertebrate cells that allows these organisms to use dietary folates. Proteins containing this domain include dihydropteroate synthase as well as a group of methyltransferase enzymes including methyltetrahydrofolate, corrinoid iron-sulphur protein methyltransferase (MeTr) that catalyses a key step in the Wood-Ljungdahl pathway of carbon dioxide fixation.

Dihydropteroate synthase (DHPS) catalyses the condensation of 6-hydroxymethyl-7,8-dihydropteridine pyrophosphate to para-aminobenzoic acid to form 7,8-dihydropteroate. This is the second step in the three-step pathway leading from 6-hydroxymethyl-7,8-dihydropterin to 7,8-dihydrofolate. DHPS is the target of sulfonamides, which are substrate analogues that compete with para-aminobenzoic acid. Bacterial DHPS (gene sul or folP) is a protein of about 275 to 315 amino acid residues that is either chromosomally encoded or found on various antibiotic resistance plasmids. In the fungus Pneumocystis jirovecii (previously P. carinii) DHPS is the C-terminal domain of a multifunctional folate synthesis enzyme (gene fas).

References

External links
 

EC 2.5.1